Karol Libelt (8 April 1807, neighborhood of Chwaliszewo in Poznań, Duchy of Warsaw - 9 June 1875, Brdowo) was a Polish philosopher, writer, political and social activist, social worker and liberal, nationalist politician, and president of the Poznań Society of Friends of Learning.

Life and work

Libelt took part in the failed November Uprising against Russia in 1830, and was imprisoned for nine months at Magdeburg. Since 1839 he became the head of a secret committee started to organise yet another uprising against the partitioning powers, which was nicknamed the Libelt Committee - Komitet Libelt). He was sentenced by the Prussian authorities to 20 years of imprisonment in a fortress for taking part in the Greater Poland Uprising (1846). However, he was amnestied in 1848 and returned to Posen (Poznań), where he took part in the Greater Poland Uprising (1848) and joined various organisations supporting the independence of Poland (Polish National Committee and Revolutionary Committee). During the Spring of Nations he was elected as one of the members of the Frankfurt Parliament; he also took part in the Slavic Congress in Prague in June 1848.

In 1849 he was elected a member of the Prussian parliament and became the director of the liberal Dziennik Polski (Polish Daily). The following year Libelt began to establish various scientific and social organisations in Greater Poland, including the Society of Friends of the Sciences in Posen (Poznań), which became a de facto university. Between 1868 and 1875 he headed the Society and gave lectures in æsthetics.  In 1873, he was elected to the Prussian Lower House.

In his philosophical works, Libelt described the so-called Polish messianism, or a belief that the history of the world would be redeemed by the Polish people, who gained moral excellence because of the suffering of their fatherland. He believed in existence of a super-rational cognitive power, visible through art. He is known internationally mainly because of the word intelligentsia popularized by him in one of his books (Filozofia i krytyka - Philosophy and Critics).

Writings
 Filozofia i krytyka, Hegelian in tendency (1845–50)
 Estetyka (1851)
 Umnictevo, a system of ethics (1857)
 Dziela (1875)
 Zbior pism pomniejszych, political papers (1849–51)
 Dziewica Orléanska (1847)
 Humor i pravada, sketches (1852)

See also 
 Poznań Society of Friends of Learning
 History of philosophy in Poland
 List of Poles

References 
 Witold Jakóbczyk, Przetrwać na Wartą 1815-1914, Dzieje narodu i państwa polskiego, vol. III-55, Krajowa Agencja Wydawnicza, Warszawa 1989
 

1807 births
1875 deaths
Writers from Poznań
Politicians from Poznań
Polish politicians
19th-century Polish philosophers
Polish male writers
November Uprising participants
Recipients of the Virtuti Militari
People from the Grand Duchy of Posen
Members of the Prussian House of Representatives
Members of the Frankfurt Parliament
Poles - political prisoners in the Prussian partition
Polish social activists of the Prussian partition
Participants of the Slavic Congress in Prague 1848
Polish messianism